Yevhen Morozenko (born 16 December 1991 in Kyiv) is a Ukraine football midfielder who plays for Livyi Bereh Kyiv.

Morozenko is a product of Dynamo Kyiv football academy.

External links 
 fcslovanliberec.cz at fcslovanliberec.cz 
 

1991 births
Living people
Footballers from Kyiv
Ukrainian footballers
Ukraine youth international footballers
FC Slovan Liberec players
Czech First League players
Expatriate footballers in the Czech Republic
FC Dynamo-2 Kyiv players
FC Hoverla Uzhhorod players
FC Oleksandriya players
FC Guria Lanchkhuti players
NK Veres Rivne players
FC Olimpik Donetsk players
FC Chornomorets Odesa players
FC Cherkashchyna players
FC Livyi Bereh Kyiv players
Ukrainian expatriate sportspeople in the Czech Republic
Ukrainian expatriate footballers
Expatriate footballers in Georgia (country)
Ukrainian expatriate sportspeople in Georgia (country)
Association football midfielders